A total solar eclipse occurred on Thursday, November 3, 1994. A solar eclipse occurs when the Moon passes between Earth and the Sun, thereby totally or partly obscuring the image of the Sun for a viewer on Earth. A total solar eclipse occurs when the Moon's apparent diameter is larger than the Sun's, blocking all direct sunlight, turning day into darkness. Totality occurs in a narrow path across Earth's surface, with the partial solar eclipse visible over a surrounding region thousands of kilometres wide. Totality was visible in Peru, northern Chile, Bolivia, northern Argentina, Paraguay including the northeastern part of its capital Asunción, Brazil and Gough Island of British overseas territory of Saint Helena, Ascension and Tristan da Cunha. The Iguazu Falls, one of the largest waterfalls systems in the world, also lies in the path of totality. Totality lasted about 4.4 minutes, so it was a relatively long total solar eclipse. Occurring only 10 hours and 2 minutes before perigee (Perigee on November 3, 1994 at 23:41 UTC, while greatest eclipse at 13:39 UTC), the moon's apparent diameter was too larger.

Images

More details about the Total Solar Eclipse of 1994 November 3. 

Eclipse Magnitude: 1.05351

Eclipse Obscuration: 1.10989

Gamma: -0.35216

Greatest Eclipse: 1994 November 03 at 13:39:05.4 UTC

Location of Greatest Eclipse: 35º21'22" S, 34º13'21" W, South Atlantic Ocean, 1,586 km (985.5 mi) off the coast of Brazil

Duration of Totality: 4 minutes, 23.28 seconds (263.28 seconds)

Sun Right Ascension: 14.57

Sun Declination: -15.1

Sun Diameter: 1934.8 arc-seconds

Moon Right Ascension: 14.56

Moon Declination: -15.4

Moon Diameter: 2006.0 arc-seconds

Saros Series: 133rd (44 of 72)

Related eclipses

Eclipses of 1994 
 An annular solar eclipse on May 10.
 A partial lunar eclipse on May 25.
 A total solar eclipse on November 3.
 A penumbral lunar eclipse on November 18.

Solar eclipses 1993–1996

Saros 133

Inex series

Metonic series

References

External links

Photos:
 Chile and Brazil, Prof. Druckmüller's eclipse photography site
 Bolivia, Prof. Druckmüller's eclipse photography site
 ON THE STRUCTURE OF 3.11.94 ECLIPSE CORONA
 Solar Corona Shape
 The 1994 Eclipse in Chile

1994 11 3
1994 in science
1994 11 3
November 1994 events
1994 in Peru
1994 in Bolivia
1994 in Paraguay
1994 in Brazil
1994 in Argentina